Catharine Grace Young is a South African neuroscientist and science policy fellow based in the United States. She is the current Senior Director of Policy for the Biden Cancer Initiative. Young has served as an American Association for the Advancement of Science Science and Technology Policy Fellow and a TED fellow.

Early life and education 
Young is from South Africa. She moved to the United States for her university studies, joining the University of North Carolina at Charlotte as part of the biology honours programme. As a postgraduate researcher she joined the University of Missouri to work in biomedical sciences. After earning her doctorate she was made a postdoctoral fellow at Cornell University, where she was based in biomedical engineering and earned a Master's of Public Affairs. She joined the American Association for the Advancement of Science Science and Technology programme, where she worked for the United States Assistant Secretary of Defense for International Security Affairs. Her work looked to eliminate biological weapons and enhance efforts for biosurveillance.

Research and career 
Young was appointed Science and Innovation Policy Advisor for the Foreign, Commonwealth and Development Office. She was based in the Embassy of the United Kingdom, where she worked on UK and US science policy.

As Senior Director of Science Policy at the Biden Cancer Initiative Young concentrated on uniting academia and industry to drive new innovation against cancer. She was named a TED fellow in 2016, creating a neuroscience based talk on how memories are formed and lost. Her talk was turned into a TEDed class.

In 2019 she was named executive director and Chief Foundation Officer of the Shepherd Foundation. The Shepherd Foundation looks to help people with rare cancers. In 2022 she joined the Office of Science and Technology Policy as part of their Cancer Moonshot team.

References 

University of Missouri alumni
South African emigrants to the United States
South African neuroscientists
Living people
Year of birth missing (living people)
Fellows of the American Association for the Advancement of Science
TED Fellows
University of North Carolina at Charlotte alumni
Cornell University alumni
United States Under Secretaries of Defense for Policy